The Thirteen Communities were a group of municipalities in the Veneto region that once primarily spoke the Cimbrian language, a dialect of Upper German, as their native tongue; the dialect is endangered today. The municipalities are located on a high plateau northeast of Verona.

List 
 
 
 
 
 
 
 
 , a part of 
 ,  of 

History 
The thirteen communities formed together into a loose commonwealth around 1280. They were historically under the suzerainty of the Milanese House of Visconti and then under the Republic of Venice. Under both they enjoyed wide cultural and political autonomy in exchange for their loyalty.

Due to the high pressure from the Italianization from fascists such as Ettore Tolomei and the government of Benito Mussolini did the Cimbrian language eventually almost completely disappear and become extinct. Only in  has Cimbrian partly survived.

Ljetzan has the cultural institute  and ethnological museum which is a repository of the Cimbrian culture and cooperates with other linguistic enclaves in Luserna and the Seven Communities. Vestiges of the once dominant language can be found in some place names.

Example 
The Cimbrian that was spoken in the Thirteen Communities was a slightly different dialect from Cimbrian spoken elsewhere.

See also 
 Sette Comuni

References

External links 
Gateway to the Land of the Cimbrians 
Cimbrians of the Thirteen Communities in Ljetzan 
Cultural Associations of the Cimbrians in Kulturverein der Zimbern im Cansiglio 
Sprachinselverein | Dreizehn Gemeinden 

Province of Verona